Smoothwater Lake is a lake in Timiskaming District, Northeastern Ontario, Canada, located in Lady Evelyn-Smoothwater Provincial Park. It is the source of the Montreal River.

References

Lakes of Timiskaming District